Power Play is a 2021 Indian Telugu language crime thriller film directed by Vijay Kumar Konda, of Gunde Jaari Gallanthayyinde fame. It stars Raj Tarun, Hemal Ingle, Poorna in the main roles. The film was released on 5 March 2021 on Amazon Prime Video.

Cast 
Raj Tarun as Vijay Kumar Konda
Hemal Ingle as Keerthy
Poorna as a CM candidate
Kota Srinivasa Rao
Prince Cecil
Ajay

Reception 
Thadhagath Pathi of The Times of India opined that "Power Play starts out well but goes down a slippery slope as the film progresses. A better treatment would’ve made this a must-watch." A critic from 123Telugu said that "On the whole, Power Play is a crime thriller that has some engaging moments here and there. Raj Tharun does well in his new avatar and the twists showcased in the second half are executed quite well". A critic from Telugucinema.com said that "Director Vijay Kumar Konda attempts a thriller for the first time and tries to narrate two parallel plots side by side and tries to mix them in the end. But the way he treats the scenes is not that impressive and it ends up as a bore".

References 

2021 films
2021 crime thriller films
2020s Telugu-language films